Jeri Parish is an administrative unit of Valmiera Municipality in the Vidzeme region of Latvia.

Towns, villages and settlements of Jeri parish 
Endzele (parish center)
Jeri
Oleri
Oleru muiža

See also
Rūjiena (town)
Ipiķi Parish
Lode Parish
Vilpulka Parish

Parishes of Latvia
Valmiera Municipality
Vidzeme